Manfred Drexler (26 June 1951 – 4 October 2017) was a German footballer who played as a midfielder and sweeper.

References

External links 
 

1951 births
2017 deaths
German footballers
Association football midfielders
Association football sweepers
Bundesliga players
2. Bundesliga players
1. FC Nürnberg players
SV Darmstadt 98 players
FC Schalke 04 players
Sportspeople from Fürth
Footballers from Bavaria